The 1990–91 Scottish League Cup was the 45th staging of the Scotland's second most prestigious football knockout competition.

The competition was won by Rangers, who defeated Celtic 2–1 in the Final at Hampden Park.

First round

Second round

Third round

Quarter-finals

Semi-finals

Final

References

Sources
Scottish League Cup 1990–91, Soccerbase
Scottish League Cup 1990–91, London Hearts

Scottish League Cup seasons
League Cup Final